ESBS may refer to:

 Earl Shilton Building Society
 École supérieure de biotechnologie Strasbourg
 European Sport Business School

See also 
 ESB (disambiguation)